is a passenger railway station located in the city of  Takaishi, Osaka Prefecture, Japan, operated by the private railway operator Nankai Electric Railway. It has the station number "NK16-2".

Lines

Layout
The station consists of a single dead-headed elevated side platform with the station building underneath.

Adjacent stations

History
Takashinohama Station opened on October 25, 1919. Operations were suspended from May 22, 2021 due to construction work, and are expected to resume in 2024.

Passenger statistics
In fiscal 2019, the station was used by an average of 1699 passengers daily.

Surrounding area
 Osaka Rinkai Sports Center
 Takaishi fishing port
Takaishi Marina

See also
 List of railway stations in Japan

References

External links
  

Railway stations in Japan opened in 1919
Railway stations in Osaka Prefecture
Takaishi, Osaka